The Altiplano Basin is a sedimentary basin within the Andes in Bolivia and Peru. The basin is located on the Altiplano plateau between the Cordillera Occidental and the Cordillera Oriental. Over-all the basin has evolved through time in a context of horizontal shortening of Earth's crust. The great thickness of the sediments accumulated in the basin is mostly the result of the erosion of Cordillera Oriental.

Description 
The northern part of the basin is overridden by the Cordillera Occidental along the Pasani Fault, a thrust fault. To the east, the northern part of the basin was overridden by the Cordillera Oriental along the Ayaviri Fault, another thrust fault albeit the fault is now buried under more recent sediments. Further south near Oruro and Sica Sica the boundary of the basin with the Cordillera Oriental block is made up by the largely buried Coniri Fault. The fault contact is not reflected in surface topography since Cordillera Oriental rises more than 10 kilometers to the east of Coniri Fault.

The sedimentation rate in the basin has varied strongly over geological time. In the Late Eocene and Oligocene, sediments accumulated in the basin at a rate of up to  every million years. Similarly in the Miocene and Oligocene (15 to 30 million years ago) the Ayaviri Sub-basin in the north accumulated  of sediments every million years.

Stratigraphy 
The basin contains three large successions of sediments. The sedimentary sequence in the basin started in the Early Paleozoic. From bottom to top these are: 
 Maastrichtian–Paleocene aged marine and non-marine sediments of the Santa Lucía and El Molino Formations.
Most of the formation is of Eocene–Oligocene age.

It has been suggested that the northern part of the Altiplano Basin experienced a significant reverse fault movement in the Oligocene and Early Miocene (c. 28 to 16 million years ago).

References

Bibliography 
 

Altiplano
Sedimentary basins of Bolivia
Sedimentary basins of Peru
Geology of La Paz Department (Bolivia)
Geology of Oruro Department
Geology of Potosí Department
Geography of Puno Region